Toe may refer to the following people:
Given name
Toe Blake (1912–1995), Canadian ice hockey player and coach
Toe Naing Mann (born 1978), Burmese businessman
Toe Nash (born 1982), American baseball player

Surname
Arcadia Martin Wesay Toe (born 1982), Liberian football striker
Aung Toe, Chief Justice of the Supreme Court of Myanmar
Khin Maung Toe (1950–2012), Burmese singer and songwriter
Nay Toe (born 1981), Burmese film actor and comedian
Shwe Toe (born 1960), Burmese dental scientist
Surnames of Liberian origin

Burmese names